Plasmodium hermani is a parasite of the genus Plasmodium subgenus Huffia. As in all Plasmodium species, P. hermani has both vertebrate and insect hosts. The vertebrate hosts for this parasite are birds.

Description
This species was first described in 1975 by Telford and Forrester in a wild turkey.

Geographical occurrence
This species is found in Florida, USA.

Vectors
Culex nigripalpus
Culex restuans
Culex salinarius
Wyeomyia vanduzeei

Note: Cx. nigripalpus appears to be the main natural vector.

Clinical features and host pathology

This species infects knots (Calidris canutus), bobwhites (Colinus virginianus) and turkeys (Meleagris gallopavo).

Infection of turkeys causes anaemia, splenomegaly and decreased growth but is not normally fatal.

References

Parasites of birds
hermani